Cartoon Classics may refer to:

Walt Disney Cartoon Classics, a compilation series of cartoons published by Disney
Weird-Ass Cartoon Classics, a show aired on MTV
Cartoon Classics, series of videos published by Vyond

See also
Color Classics